Juan Pablo Ledezma (a.k.a. José Luis Fratello) is the alleged current leader of the Mexican gang called La Línea, which is the leading armed wing of the drug trafficking organization known as the Juárez Cartel and is said to be the current head of the organization.

Arrest warrant
The Mexican government is currently offering a $2 million USD bounty for information leading to his capture. In 2019, imprisoned Sinaloa Cartel operative Jesús 'El Rey' Zambada revealed that notorious Sinaloa Cartel leader Joaquin "El Chapo" Guzman had issued a bounty for Ledezma's death after Ledezma ended the Juarez Cartel's alliance with the Sinaloa Cartel. Ledezma is also suspected of orchestrating El Chapo’s brother’s killing in prison. Zambada also claimed that Ledezma was the only person who earned "an enormous hatred" from El Chapo. At the time of his arrest in May 2020, it was reported that Luis Alberto “El Mocho” M. was at that point the leader of La Linea and that El Mocho's predecessor, who is also imprisoned, is named Ricardo Arturo “El Piporro” C.

See also
 List of Mexico's 37 most-wanted drug lords
 Mexican Drug War
 Mérida Initiative
 War on Drugs

References

External links
 PHOTO of Juan Pablo Ledezma 

1987 births
Fugitives wanted by Mexico
Fugitives wanted by the United States
Fugitives wanted on organised crime charges
Juárez Cartel traffickers
Living people
Mexican drug traffickers
People from Ciudad Juárez